The 1946 Alabama gubernatorial election took place on November 5, 1946, to elect the governor of Alabama. Incumbent Democrat Chauncey Sparks was term-limited, and could not seek a second consecutive term.

Democratic primary
At the time this election took place, Alabama, as with most other southern states, was solidly Democratic, and the Republican Party had such diminished influence that the Democratic primary was the de facto contest for state offices.

Candidates
 Elbert Boozer, Calhoun County probate judge
 Leven H. Ellis, lieutenant governor
 Jim Folsom, businessman and candidate for governor in 1942
 Gordon Persons, president of the Public Service Commission
 Joe N. Poole, Commissioner of Agriculture and Industries

Results

Runoff
As no candidate received a majority of votes, a runoff election was held.

Results

References

Alabama gubernatorial elections
1946 Alabama elections
Alabama
November 1946 events in the United States